Erwin Kurz (29 April 1846, in Aarau – 8 February 1901) was a Swiss politician and President of the Swiss National Council (1887/1888).

External links 
 
 

1846 births
1901 deaths
People from Aarau
Swiss Calvinist and Reformed Christians
Free Democratic Party of Switzerland politicians
Members of the National Council (Switzerland)
Presidents of the National Council (Switzerland)